Koiso is the surname of the following people
Erkki Koiso (1934-2000), Finish ice hockey player
Kuniaki Koiso (1880-1950), Japanese prime minister
Noriko Koiso (born in 1974), Japanese basketball player
Ryōhei Koiso (1903-1988), Japanese artist

Finnish-language surnames
Japanese-language surnames